William Ogilvie Walker was a Scottish amateur footballer who made over 150 appearances as a full back in the Scottish League for Queen's Park. He represented Scotland at amateur level.

References

1906 births
Scottish footballers
Scottish Football League players
Queen's Park F.C. players
Place of death missing
Date of death missing
Association football fullbacks
People from Partick
Scotland amateur international footballers